Lost Creek Township may refer to one of the following places in the United States:

 Lost Creek Township, Vigo County, Indiana
 Lost Creek Township, Wayne County, Missouri
 Lost Creek Township, Platte County, Nebraska
 Lostcreek Township, Miami County, Ohio

Township name disambiguation pages